Bilhaur is a town and a municipal board in Kanpur Nagar district which is situated  in the state of Uttar Pradesh, India. It is 56 km from Kanpur and situated where the Isan River joins the River Ganges. Araul is nearest village of Bilhaur and distance is 11 km.

Demographics
 India census, Bilhaur had a population of 18,056. Males constitute 53% of the population and females 47%. Bilhaur has an average literacy rate of 53%, lower than the national average of 59.5%; with male literacy of 56% and female literacy of 49%. 15% of the population is under 6 years of age. Most of the community living here are Kurmi khsatriya's & Brahmins and Hinduism is the main religion.

General information
The original name of the town was Bilva Hari, but it was pronounced Bilhaur in local dialect and that name came to be officially accepted.  Agriculture and animal husbandry are important to the local economy. There are two local Inter colleges, and the Indus Institute of Technology and Management. Bilhaur Inter College celebrated its golden jubilee on 13/03/2012. Madar Sharif is a place of pilgrimage situated on the Isan river. And Dr.Shubhendra was born here and a famous orthopaedic surgeon Dr. S. Mustaq Ahmed

See also
 Bilhaur (Lok Sabha constituency)
 Raypur
Gadanpur Chorsa

References

Cities and towns in Kanpur Nagar district